These are the results of the 2021 South American Championships in Athletics which took place in Guayaquil, Ecuador, from 29 to 31 May at the Estadio Modelo Alberto Spencer Herrera.

Men's results

100 meters

Heats – 29 MayWind:Heat 1: +1.0 m/s, Heat 2: +1.7 m/s

Final – 29 MayWind:+2.3 m/s

Extra – 29 MayWind: 0.0 m/s

200 meters

Heats – 31 MayWind:Heat 1: +1.8 m/s, Heat 2: +0.7 m/s

Final – 31 MayWind:+1.9 m/s

400 meters

Heats – 29 May

Final – 29 May

Extra – 29 May

800 meters

Heats – 30 May

Final – 31 May

1500 meters 
29 May

5000 meters
31 May

10,000 meters
29 May

110 meters hurdles

Heats – 30 MayWind:Heat 1: +1.5 m/s, Heat 2: +1.6 m/s

Final – 30 MayWind:+0.7 m/s

400 meters hurdles

Heats – 30 May

Final – 31 May

3000 meters steeplechase
30 May

4 × 100 meters relay
31 May

4 × 400 meters relay
31 May

20,000 meters walk
30 May

High jump
29 May

Pole vault
30 May

Long jump
29 May

Triple jump
30 May

Shot put
30 May

Discus throw
29 May

Hammer throw
30 May

Javelin throw
29 May

Decathlon
30–31 May

Women's results

100 meters

Heats – 29 MayWind:Heat 1: +0.7 m/s, Heat 2: +1.7 m/s

Final – 29 MayWind:+1.0 m/s

Extra – 29 MayWind: 0.0 m/s

200 meters

Heats – 31 MayWind:Heat 1: +1.7 m/s, Heat 2: +2.2 m/s

Final – 31 MayWind:+0.8 m/s

400 meters

Heats – 29 May

Final – 29 May

Extra – 29 May

800 meters

Heats – 30 May

Final – 31 May

1500 meters
29 May

5000 meters 
30 May

10,000 meters 
29 May

100 meters hurdles
29 MayWind: +2.8 m/s

400 meters hurdles
31 May

3000 meters steeplechase
30 May

4 × 100 meters relay
31 May

4 × 400 meters relay
31 May

20,000 meters walk
29 May

High jump
30 May

Pole vault
29 May

Long jump
29 May

Triple jump
30 May

Shot put
30 May

Discus throw
29 May

Hammer throw
30 May

Javelin throw
29 May

Heptathlon
29–30 May

Mixed events

4 × 400 meters relay
30 May

References

South American Championships in Athletics - Results
Events at the South American Championships in Athletics